Ardiente secreto is a Mexican telenovela produced by Irene Sabido for Televisa in 1978. It is based on the Charlotte Brontë's 1847 novel Jane Eyre.

Plot
The orphan Mariana Cisneros was shut in (in a college) by an aunt who hates her, she suffers from some terrible pains, but she take advantage of the education and culture. When she turns 18 she finds a job as a governess of a silent and lonely child, Adela, who is the daughter of Eduardo. Mariana wins Adela's love and she is attracted by Eduardo. Mariana and Eduardo fall in love, but a terrible secret will take them apart. She discovers it on the day of their marriage. Mariana is desperate and she escapes, but for love she will return again.

Cast 
Daniela Romo as Mariana
Joaquín Cordero as Eduardo
Lorena Velázquez
Virginia Manzano
Dolores Tinoco
Patricia Tanus as Adela
Ada Carrasco
Eduardo Liñán
Erika Carrasco as Mariana (child)

References

External links 

Mexican telenovelas
1978 telenovelas
Televisa telenovelas
Films based on Jane Eyre
Spanish-language telenovelas
1978 Mexican television series debuts
1978 Mexican television series endings